John Dickey may refer to:

John Dickey (U.S. politician), member of the U.S. House of Representatives from Pennsylvania
John Dickey (Canadian politician), member of the Canadian House of Commons
John Miller Dickey, Presbyterian minister and college president
John Sloan Dickey, American diplomat and scholar